Chabad on Campus International is a division of Merkos L'Inyonei Chinuch, the educational arm of the Chabad Lubavitch movement. It is one of the largest Jewish organizations serving college campuses, with over 185 permanent branches on North American campuses, and an additional 250 globally.

Mission
The Chabad on Campus International assists local Chabad Student Centers worldwide. This includes logistical support and staff training, as well as centralized programming such as national Shabbatons and student leadership retreats. The foundation provides grants to encourage creative local programming.

History

The first campus Chabad House, UCLA Chabad House, was established under the  Lubavitcher Rebbe's direction by Rabbi Shlomo Cunin on the UCLA campus in 1969.  Since 2001 the Chabad campus presence has tripled (78 new centers).

In August 2015, Chabad on Campus announced that 19 "emissary couples" would be sent to schools across the United States to open up Jewish cultural centers. Target campuses include "the University of South Carolina, Louisiana State University, the University of Utah, Tulane University, Caltech, and the University of Alabama.” Chabad mentioned increasing anti-semitism as a partial motive for its expansion. Chabad is generally more known for its outreach to non-religious Jews than for pro-Israel activism.

According to a report by Inside Higher Ed, the number of Chabad on Campus centers grew from 36 in 2000 to 258 in 2021. Chabad claims that it serves Jewish students at 708 colleges internationally.

See also
Hillel International

References

External links
 Chabad on Campus Official Website

Jewish youth organizations
Chabad houses
Chabad organizations
Jewish organizations established in 1969
International student religious organizations
Student religious organizations in the United States
Chabad-Lubavitch (Hasidic dynasty)